Cemal is the Turkish spelling of the Arabic masculine given name Jamal (Arabic: جَمَال jamāl) which means "beauty, charm". 

People named Cemal include:

First name
 Cemal Erçman (1896–?), Turkish weightlifter
 Cemal Gürsel (1895–1966), Turkish army general and fourth President of Turkey
 Cemal Nalga (born 1987), Turkish basketball player
 Cemal Oğuz, Turkish judoka
 Cemal Pasha (1872–1922), Ottoman military leader
 Cemal Süreya (1931–1990), Turkish writer
 Cemal Yıldırım (1925–2009), Turkish philosopher

Middle name
 Ahmed Cemal Eringen (1921–2009), Turkish- American engineering scientist
 Feridun Cemal Erkin (1899–1980), Turkish diplomat and politician
 Ulvi Cemal Erkin (1906–1972), Turkish composer

Turkish masculine given names